Minister of Ports and Highways may refer to
 Minister of Highways, Ports & Shipping, Sri Lanka
 Minister of Highways, Ports and Properties (Isle of Man)

See also
 Department of Highways and Minor Ports (Tamil Nadu), India